Almendarez-Torres v. United States, 523 U.S. 224 (1998), was a decision by the United States Supreme Court which confirmed that a sentencing enhancement based on a prior conviction was not subject to the Sixth Amendment requirement for a jury to determine the fact beyond a reasonable doubt.

Facts
He pleaded guilty and, at the plea hearing, admitted that he had been deported, that he had unlawfully returned to the United States, and that the earlier deportation had followed three convictions for aggravated felonies.

At the sentencing hearing, Almendarez-Torres pointed out that the Sixth Amendment required that all the elements of a crime be spelled out in the indictment. The indictment in this case did not mention the earlier convictions for aggravated felonies.  As a result, the maximum sentence for which he was eligible was two years in prison.  The district court rejected this argument and sentenced him to 85 months in prison.  The Fifth Circuit affirmed the conviction and sentence.

Majority opinion
The statute at issue.  The statute that defines the crime under which Almendarez-Torres was convicted reads:

§ 1326.  Reentry of deported alien; criminal penalties for reentry of certain deported aliens.
(a) Subject to subsection (b) of this section, any alien who—
(1) has been... deported... and thereafter
(2) enters... or at any time is found in the United States [without the consent of the Attorney General],
shall be fined under title 18, or imprisoned not more than 2 years, or both.

(b) Notwithstanding subsection (a) of this section, in the case of any alien described in such subsection—
(1) whose deportation was subsequent to a conviction for commission of [certain misdemeanors] or a felony [other than an aggravated felony], such alien shall be fined under title 18, or imprisoned not more than 10 years or both, or
(2) whose deportation was subsequent to a conviction for an aggravated felony, such alien shall be fined under title 18, imprisoned not more than 20 years, or both.

The Court had to decide whether subsection (b)(2), the provision that allowed the district court to impose the 85-month sentence in this case, was a separate crime or merely a penalty provision.  If it defined a separate crime, then the Government's failure to include it in the indictment meant that the conviction and sentence had to be set aside.  If it merely defined a penalty provision, then the conviction and sentence could stand.

Subsection (b)(2) is a penalty provision.  According to the Court, it was "reasonably clear" that subsection (b)(2) defines a penalty provision.  First, the provision entailed recidivism, which "is as typical a sentencing factor as one might imagine."  Recidivism provisions had almost always been interpreted as penalty enhancements, not separate crimes.  Second, Congress usually uses the words at the beginning of subsection (a), "subject to subsection (b)," and at the beginning of subsection (b), "notwithstanding subsection (a) of this section," to define heightened penalty provisions, not separate crimes.  Finally, forcing the government to prove at trial that the defendant had previously been convicted of a crime risks making trials inherently unfair insofar as the jury, faced with such evidence, would be more inclined to convict the defendant on the basis of those prior convictions alone rather than the evidence that he is guilty of the presently charged crime.

The recidivism exception to the Sixth Amendment.  The Court also held that the Sixth Amendment does not require courts to treat recidivism as an element of the crime irrespective of the intent of Congress.  True, the Court had held that all "elements" of the crime must be proved beyond a reasonable doubt, but it had also held that the state could place the burden of proving some sentencing factors on the defendant.  But recidivism was not like an element of a crime, or most other sentencing factors, because it could neither be presumed nor proved.  Indeed, recidivism is one of the oldest and most common reasons for enhancing a criminal's punishment.  Because of this historical pedigree, the Court could not find support in its modern precedents for the idea that it must be proved by the prosecution beyond a reasonable doubt.  True, a few states had such a requirement on their own, but those states had never rested this requirement on a federal constitutional guarantee.  Nor does the fact that the increased punishment available is significant by itself trigger a constitutional requirement that it be proved beyond a reasonable doubt.

Dissenting opinion
Reading the text of subsections (a) and (b), Justice Scalia concluded that the recidivism provisions of subsections (b)(1) and (2) were additional elements of separate crimes.  This conclusion had two premises.  First, the two subsections had parallel language that was nearly identical.  Second, concluding that Congress had intended for subsection (b) to define separate crimes would have allowed the Court to avoid deciding the constitutional question of whether the Sixth Amendment required the Court to construe subsection (b) in that way regardless of Congress's intent.

See also
 List of United States Supreme Court cases, volume 523
 List of United States Supreme Court cases
 Lists of United States Supreme Court cases by volume

External links
 

1998 in United States case law
United States Sixth Amendment sentencing case law
United States Supreme Court cases
United States Supreme Court cases of the Rehnquist Court